4-Aminophenol (or para-aminophenol or ''p''-aminophenol) is an organic compound with the formula H2NC6H4OH. Typically available as a white powder, it is commonly used as a developer for black-and-white film, marketed under the name Rodinal.

Reflecting its slightly hydrophilic character, the white powder is moderately soluble in alcohols and can be recrystallized from hot water. In the presence of a base, it oxidizes readily. The methylated derivatives N-methylaminophenol and N,N-dimethylaminophenol are of commercial value.

The compound is one of three isomeric aminophenols, the other two being 2-aminophenol and 3-aminophenol.



Preparation

From phenol 
It is produced from phenol by nitration followed by reduction with iron.  Alternatively, the partial hydrogenation of nitrobenzene affords phenylhydroxylamine, which rearranges primarily to 4-aminophenol (Bamberger rearrangement).

C6H5NO2 + 2 H2 → C6H5NHOH + H2O

C6H5NHOH → HOC6H4NH2

From nitrobenzene 
It can be produced from nitrobenzene by electrolytic conversion to phenylhydroxylamine, which spontaneously rearranges to 4-aminophenol.

From 4-nitrophenol 
4-nitrophenol can be reduced through a variety of methods, to yield 4-aminophenol. One method involves hydrogenation over a Raney Nickel catalyst. A second method involves selective reduction of the nitro group by Tin(II) Chloride in anhydrous ethanol or ethyl ethanoate.

Uses
4-Aminophenol is a building block used in organic chemistry. Prominently, it is the final intermediate in the industrial synthesis of paracetamol. Treating 4-aminophenol with acetic anhydride gives paracetamol:

It is a precursor to amodiaquine, mesalazine, AM404, parapropamol, B-86810 & B-87836 (c.f. ).

4-Aminophenol converts readily to the diazonium salt.

References 

Aminophenols